= Solus 29 =

Danish keelboat

Solus 29 is a Danish keelboat designed by Bjarne Marcussen in 1978. She was built as a successor to the successful Solus 24.

Designer	Bjarne Marcussen
Year built	1978–1986
Yard	A/S Frederikssund skibsværft
Country	Denmark
Number built	Approx. 50
Rig type	Bermuda
Main sail	17 m^{2}
Jib	20 m^{2}
Genoa	30 m^{2}
DH-88	6.25
LYS	1.08
Scandicap	6.5
Length	8.70 m (29 ft)
Length i waterline	7.30 m
Beam	2.95
Speed	7 knots
Propulsion	Sail
Hull material	Fibreglass
Cabin material	Fibreglass
Displacement	3,000 kg
Displacement without motor	2,800 kg
Keel type	Fin keel
Draught	1.6 m
Keel material	Iron
Keel weight	1,400 kg
Keel %	46%
Bunks	5
Outfitting	Teak
Galley	Yes
Water tank	80 litres
Tank material	Fibreglass
Heads	1
Bottom paint	25 m^{2}
